André Martins may refer to:

André Martins (footballer, born 1990), Portuguese central midfielder
André Martins (footballer, born 1989), Portuguese goalkeeper
André Martins (footballer, born 1987), Portuguese forward

See also
André Martin (disambiguation)